Little Anthony and the Imperials is an American rhythm and blues/soul vocal group from New York City founded by Clarence Collins in the 1950s and named in part for its lead singer, Jerome Anthony "Little Anthony" Gourdine, who was noted for his high-pitched voice. In addition to Collins and Gourdine, the original Imperials included Ernest Wright, Glouster "Nate" Rogers, and Tracey Lord, the last two of whom were subsequently replaced by Sammy Strain.  The group was one of the very few doo-wop groups to enjoy sustained success on the R&B and pop charts throughout the 1960s. They were inducted into the Rock and Roll Hall of Fame on April 4, 2009, 23 years after the group's first year of eligibility for induction.

Career
In 1957, a doo-wop group known as "The Chesters" was composed of Collins, whose falsetto had been inspired by Jimmy Scott; Tracey Lord, Nathaniel Rodgers, and Ronald Ross. Anthony Gourdine, a former member of The DuPonts, joined as lead vocalist. Ernest Wright took over from Ross, and the group recorded briefly for Apollo Records.

Changing their name to "The Imperials", the group signed with End Records in 1958. Their first single was "Tears on My Pillow", which was an instant hit. It sold over one million copies, and was awarded a gold disc by the RIAA. The B-side, "Two People in the World", was also a hit. The group followed up with "Shimmy, Shimmy, Ko Ko Bop" in 1960. When their success dwindled in 1961, Gourdine left to attempt a solo career. Original Imperials member Nate 
Rogers was drafted into the service and Tracey Lord, another original member, left 
to get married. The line-up then became Collins, Wright, Sammy Strain, (a childhood friend who had grown up together with the Imperials in Brooklyn), and George Kerr. Kerr was replaced by Kenny W. Seymour after a short time. This line-up had little success.

Gourdine returned in 1963, replacing Seymour. The group's classic line-up – Gourdine, Wright, Collins, and Strain – was now complete. With the help of record producer/songwriter Teddy Randazzo (a childhood friend of the group), the Imperials found success on the new DCP (Don Costa Productions) label with the dramatic pop-soul records "I'm on the Outside (Looking In)" (1964), "Goin' Out of My Head" (1964), "Hurt So Bad" (1965), "I Miss You So" (1965), "Take Me Back" (1965), "Hurt" (1966), "Better Use Your Head" (1966), and "Out of Sight, Out of Mind" (1969). In 1965, the Imperials appeared on the CBS-TV special Murray The K – It's What's Happening, Baby, where they performed "I'm Alright" before a live audience in New York at the Brooklyn Fox Theatre. At the height of their career, the group made two appearances on The Ed Sullivan Show, at the time television's top talent showcase, on March 28, 1965, and again on January 25, 1970. They also performed on Shindig! Hullabaloo, Kraft Music Hall, Soul Train, American Bandstand, The Midnight Special, and The Tonight Show.

The Imperials then joined United Artists Records and were assigned to its Veep Records subsidiary, and then to the parent label itself, where they recorded "World of Darkness", "It's Not The Same", "If I Remember To Forget", "Yesterday Has Gone", and the Thom Bell-produced "Help Me Find A Way (To Say I Love You)".

Albums from this era include: Reflections, Payin' Our Dues, Out Of Sight, Out Of Mind (named after their hit cover of The Five Keys song), and Movie Grabbers, which included a rendition of "You Only Live Twice", the James Bond motion picture theme. This song was originally recorded by The Imperials – expressly for the film and its soundtrack – but was later given instead to Nancy Sinatra for the film, due to her father Frank's greater influence.

They recorded three singles for Janus Records including "Father Father", which they later performed on the Merv Griffin Show. Then they went to Avco Records in the mid-1970s and recorded On A New Street, and charted with the songs "La La La (At the End)" and "I'm Falling in Love With You". This album was produced by both Bell and Randazzo. A second LP for Avco Records entitled Hold On was withdrawn from sale in the USA after the failure of the title track to sell and Avco's subsequent financial difficulties. The group appeared on Soul Train on May 26, 1973. By this time, Strain and Wright had left the group, although both would eventually return.

Wright left in 1971 to join Tony Williams' Platters. He was replaced by the returning Kenny Seymour, who was again replaced after a short time by Bobby Wade, formerly a Cleveland-based singer with a number of solo releases on Cleveland labels, that included Way Out and Big Jim. Strain left in 1972. He had a restaurant in Los Angeles and had not been singing professionally for three years. At the end of that period, he was briefly a member of The Fandangos with Lonnie Cook and Alvin Walker. He also auditioned for the lead voice of Arpeggio. Strain had been replaced by Harold Jenkins as a member of The Imperials. He then joined the O'Jays as the replacement for original O'Jays member William Powell, who left the group due to illness. (Powell died of cancer shortly thereafter.) Jenkins had already been functioning as the group's choreographer. Jenkins and Seymour had previously performed together in the Impacts. Gourdine left for a second (more successful) attempt at a solo career. The trio of Collins, Wade, and Jenkins continued as "the Imperials". Collins left in 1988, and was replaced by Sherman James. They then toured as "Bobby Wade's Imperials". James left in 1992, and was replaced by Ron Stevenson.

Reunion
In 1992, Collins, Wright, Strain, and Gourdine reunited for a concert at Madison Square Garden. This reunion proved to be a success. When the decision was made for the foursome to tour together again, Wade relinquished the Imperials name, with his group becoming "Bobby Wade's Emperors" when they became the house band at Caesars Palace in Las Vegas. At this point, Strain left the O'Jays, and permanently returned to the Imperials. 1992, the year of the group's reformation, was also the 40th anniversary of Dick Clark's American Bandstand, and he invited the Imperials to appear as part of the televised special celebration.

On August 30, 1997, the group was featured on NBC's Today show as part of that show's "Summer Concert Series", and appeared on three popular PBS specials: Rock, Rhythm, and Doo-Wop and Red, White and Rock in 2002; and Soul Spectacular: 40 Years Of R&B in 2003. Also, during this period, they recorded two new CDs: Little Anthony & the Imperials – Live: Up Close & Personal (the group's first ever live album), and Pure Acapella, an all a cappella CD showcasing the group's vocal talents on several classic 1950s doo-wop songs, including their own hit, "Two People in the World", which was written by Imperials member Ernest Wright. These two recordings marked the first time that the classic line-up had recorded together in over 30 years.
In 2009, the year of the group's Rock and Roll Hall of Fame induction, Little Anthony and the Imperials released their first new CD in years, entitled You'll Never Know.

Later years: 2000 to present
Gourdine, Collins, Wright, and Strain continued touring as "Little Anthony and the Imperials" until Strain retired in 2004 and Jenkins, for the second time, returned to take his place. In 2010, Jenkins also retired, and was replaced by Robert DeBlanc. , the Imperials were (along with the Dells), one of the few 1950s-era R&B groups still touring with the great majority of their original members (Gourdine, Collins, and Wright).

Little Anthony and the Imperials released their first new LP in several years in October 2008, entitled "You'll Never Know", and they performed on the Late Show with David Letterman on August 26, 2008. On their Discovery album, the electronic music duo Daft Punk sampled Little Anthony and the Imperials' 1977 recording of "Can You Imagine" for the track "Crescendolls".

Imperials founder Collins retired from the group in late 2012 for age and health reasons. He still owns the trademark on The Imperials' name. He and Anthony were once married to twin sisters, Brenda Collins and Linda Gourdine, but Brenda and Clarence have since divorced.  The Contemporary Christian Gospel Group The Imperials uses the name with Collins' permission. Gourdine's first wife was Judy Fouseca, with whom he had four children, and four more by his second wife, Linda. Strain, once married to singer Yvonne Fair (now deceased), is married to his second wife, DeBorah, and has two children, Vincent and Shawn. Original member Wright is married and has a daughter, Nicole. He is also a songwriter and producer. Original Imperials bass singer Glouster "Nate" Rogers is a cancer survivor. He has been married many years to wife Loretta. Original Imperials member Tracey Lord is deceased.

In early 2014, Gourdine toured the UK with David Gest's Legends of Soul, when he performed "Tears on My Pillow" and "Goin' Out of My Head" 
. The same year, he released his biography, Little Anthony: My Journey, My Destiny, recounting his life, his memories, and his years with The Imperials.

, The Imperials are still performing. Imperials founder Collins, now retired, has been replaced by Johnny Britt. De Blanc and original members Wright and Gourdine round out the group. When the group is not touring, Gourdine does stage plays and currently also has a one-man show, which he is currently doing to support his recently released biography, and to celebrate his 55-plus years as a performer.

Cover versions, influence, and legacy 

Over the decades, in a measure of their profound influence, several of The Imperials' hit songs have been covered by numerous other artists of many different musical genres, including pop, jazz, MOR, rock, Latin, country, doo-wop, and R&B. Some examples:
 "Hurt So Bad" an Imperials' Top Ten smash, was covered by Linda Ronstadt, as well as the Lettermen, Alicia Keys, Grant Green, the Delfonics, Nancy Wilson, Nancy Holloway, the Philly Devotions, Willie Hutch, Arthur Prysock, Tracy Huang, Cathy Carlson, Willie Bovain, Ramsey Lewis, Herb Alpert and The Tijuana Brass, and Nancy Holliday.
 "I'm on the Outside (Looking In)", a top 20 hit for the Imperials, has been covered by the Miracles, Johnny Mathis, Amy Winehouse, the Lettermen, and the Jaggerz.
 "Tears on My Pillow", the Imperials' first million-selling hit, has been covered by numerous artists, including the McGuire Sisters, Sha Na Na, New Edition, and S Club 8. Clem Snide recorded a cover for the Stubbs the Zombie soundtrack.  "Tears on My Pillow" has also been covered by Timi Yuro, Chuck Jackson, Bobby Vee, Lou Christie, Martha and the Vandellas, Bobby Vinton, Johnny Tillotson, Neil Sedaka, Reba McEntire, Jodeci, Lorrie Morgan, Derrick Morgan with Lyn Tait & the Jets, Neils Children, Kylie Minogue, and the Fleetwoods. 
 "Goin' Out of My Head", another Top 10 hit, and Little Anthony and the Imperials' signature song, has had over 50 different cover versions by other artists, including the Delfonics, Vic Damone, Cilla Black, Petula Clark, Willie Bobo, Sergio Mendes and Brazil '66, Ella Fitzgerald, Lou Christie, Les McCann, the Lettermen, Ramsey Lewis, Luther Vandross, Ray Conniff, Frank Sinatra, Lawrence Welk, Florence Ballard, and the Miracles.
  "Better Use Your Head", the Imperials' 1966 transatlantic hit, has been covered by Barry Ryan, Robin Wilson, Dennis D'ell, and Marion Ryan.
"Take Me Back", Little Anthony and the Imperials' 1965 top 20 hit, has been covered by Country Music artists Glen Campbell, Ronnie Dove and Sonny James
"If I Love You", a 1970 song by the Imperials, was later covered by The Stylistics on their first album for Avco Records two years later.
 "The Loneliest House on the Block", an early 1970s Imperials tune, from their album On A New Street, was covered by soul vocal group Blue Magic . 
 The Imperials' 1968 single,  "Yesterday Has Gone", was covered by UK band Cupid's Inspiration in 1968 and climbed to #4 in the UK singles chart; the song was also recorded in 1996 by Marc Almond and P.J. Proby.
 "Two People In The World", the hit "B" side of The Imperials' first-million-selling hit, "Tears on My Pillow", has been covered by : Paul and Paula, The Dovells, and The Marcels .   
 
In addition, according to songwriter and producer Kenny Gamble, Little Anthony and the Imperials and their music were a major influence in the development of Philadelphia soul, and artists such as the Stylistics, the Delfonics, Blue Magic (who covered the Imperials' tune "The Loneliest House on the Block"), Chicago's Chi-Lites, and other groups. They were also the first contemporary music group to play New York's prestigious Copacabana nightclub, even predating the Temptations and Supremes.

2009 Rock and Roll Hall of Fame induction and other awards
Little Anthony and the Imperials received the Rhythm and Blues Foundation's Pioneer Award in 1993.  They were inducted into the Vocal Group Hall of Fame in 1999 and the Long Island Music Hall of Fame on October 15, 2006. In 2007, the Imperials were inducted into the Hit Parade Hall of Fame On January 14, 2009, it was announced that Little Anthony and the Imperials had been inducted into the Rock and Roll Hall of Fame. Gourdine, Wright, Collins, Strain, and Rogers were present to be honored. Deceased original Imperials member Tracey Lord was inducted posthumously; his sons accepted his Rock and Roll Hall of Fame induction on his behalf. The group was inducted by Smokey Robinson. In October 2009, the group performed "Two People in the World" at the 25th Anniversary Rock & Roll Hall of Fame Concert. In 2014, Goldmine magazine inducted the Imperials into The Goldmine Hall of Fame.  Editor Phil Marder referred to them as one of the few 1950s doo-wop groups (though the group hated that label) to consistently chart hits during the British Invasion. Goldmine also named Little Anthony and the Imperials as one of The 20 Greatest Doo-Wop Groups of All Time.

Sammy Strain is one of the few artists in popular music history to be a double Rock and Roll Hall of Fame inductee, having been inducted with the O'Jays in 2005 and the Imperials in 2009.

In 2018, Little Anthony and the Imperials were inducted into the Rhythm and Blues Music Hall of Fame in Detroit.

Discography

Albums
 We Are the Imperials, featuring Little Anthony – End LP 303 (1959)
 Shades of the 40s – End LP 311 (1960)
The above two albums were issued only in mono
 I'm on the Outside Looking In – DCP DCL-3801 (Mono)/DCS-6801 (Stereo) (1964) – Pop #135
Re-released in 1966 on Veep VP 13510 (Mono)/VPS 16510 (Stereo)
 Goin' Out of My Head – DCP DCL-3808/DCS-6808 (1965) – Pop #74, R&B #5

Re-released in 1966 on Veep VP 13511/VPS 16511
 The Best of Little Anthony & the Imperials – DCP DCL-3809/DCS-6809 (1965) – Pop #97
Re-released in 1966 on Veep VP 13512/VPS 16512
 Payin' Our Dues – Veep VP 13513/VPS 16513 (1966)
 Reflections – Veep VP 13514/VPS 16514 (1967)
 Movie Grabbers – Veep VP 13516/VPS 16516 (1967)
 The Best of Anthony & the Imperials, Volume 2 – Veep VPS 16519 (1968)
The above four albums are credited as "Anthony & the Imperials"
 Out of Sight, Out of Mind – United Artists UAS 6720 (1969) – Pop #172
 On A New Street – Avco AV-11012 (1973)
 Hold On – Avco SWX 6263 (1975)
(Only demo copies existed until 2013, when this album was released in a 2-for-1 CD with The Imperials' On A New Street album by Soulmusic.Com Records.)

Singles

References

External links

Musical groups established in 1958
Doo-wop groups
American soul musical groups
Northern soul musicians
African-American musical groups
American vocal groups
American rhythm and blues musical groups
Avco Records artists
1958 establishments in New York City
Musical groups from New York City